Raymond Rouleau (4 June 1904 – 11 December 1981) was a Belgian actor and film director. He appeared in more than 40 films between 1928 and 1979. He also directed 22 films between 1932 and 1981. Rouleau studied at the Royal Conservatory of Brussels, where he met Tania Balachova. They emigrated to Paris together and collaborated with a variety of directors at the cutting edge of French theatre, including Charles Dullin and Gaston Baty. They married in France and separated in 1940. He subsequently married the actress Françoise Lugagne.

Partial filmography

 L'Argent (1928) - Jantrou
 The Nude Woman (1932) - Pierre Bernier
 Suzanne (1932)
 Le jugement de minuit (1933) - L'inspecteur Berry
 Une vie perdue (1933)
 Volga in Flames (1934) - Schalin
 Vers l'abîme (1934) - Rist
 Les beaux jours (1935) - Boris - le deuxième amoureux de Sylvie
 Donogoo (1936) - Pierre
 Le coeur dispose (1937) - Robert Levaltier
 The Messenger (1937, director)
 The Lafarge Case (1938) - Maître Lachaud
 The Shanghai Drama (1938) - Le journaliste André Franchon
 Conflict (1938) - Michel Lafont
 Coups de feu (1939) - Le lieutenant Stanislas de Glombinski
 Le duel (1941) - Henri Maurey
 First Ball (1941) - Jean de Lormel
 Who Killed Santa Claus? (1941) - Le baron Roland de la Faille
 Miss Bonaparte (1942) - Philippe de Vaudrey
 La femme que j'ai le plus aimée (1942) - Claude Ferval, l'auteur dramatique
 The Trump Card (1942) - Clarence
 The Honourable Catherine (1943) - Jacques Tavère
 Monsieur des Lourdines (1943) - Anthime des Lourdines
 The Secret of Madame Clapain (1943) - François Berthier
 L'aventure est au coin de la rue (1944) - Pierre Trévoux
 Documents secrets (1945) - Radlo
 Paris Frills (1945) - Philippe Clarence
 The Ideal Couple (1946) - Diavolo / Henri
 Dernier refuge (1947) - Philippe
 Vertiges (1947) - Dr. Jean Favier
 L'aventure commence demain (1948) - Claude Largeais
 Une grande fille toute simple (1948) - Simon
 L'inconnu d'un soir (1949) - Le roi Jean IV
 Mission in Tangier (1949) - Georges Masse
 Les femmes sont folles (1950) - Claude Barrois
 Beware of Blondes (1950) - Georges Masse
 Tapage nocturne (1951) - Commissaire Legrand
 My Wife Is Formidable (1951) - L'homme giflé par Sylvia (uncredited)
 Massacre in Lace (1952) - Georges Masse
  (1952) - L'inspecteur Wens (segment "Mort dans l'ascenseur, Le")
 Il est minuit, docteur Schweitzer (1952) - Le commandant Lieuvin
 Les Intrigantes (1954) - Paul Rémi
 Une fille épatante (1955) - Jacques Mareuil
 The Crucible (1957, director) - Governor Danforth (uncredited)
 Le fric (1959) - Williams
 The Lovers of Teruel (1962, director)
 The Big Scare (1964) - Chabriant, le maire
 Deux heures à tuer (1966) - De Rock
 Vogue la galère (1973, director)

References

External links

1904 births
1981 deaths
Belgian male film actors
Belgian film directors
20th-century Belgian male actors